The Kewanee A's were a minor league baseball team based in Kewanee, Illinois in the 1948 and 1949 seasons after the nearby Moline A's relocated to Kewanee. The A's played as exclusively as members of the Central Association, winning the 1949 league championship. The Kewanee A's were  a minor league affiliate of the Philadelphia Athletics. The A's were preceded in Kewanee by the Kewanee Boilermakers, who played from 1908 to 1913.

History
Minor league baseball began in Kewanee, Illinois in 1908, when the Kewanee Boilermakers became charter members of the Class D level Central Association, playing in the league through 1913.

After folding in 1913, minor league baseball returned to Kewanee in 1948. On June 18, 1948, the Moline A's of the Central Association moved from Moline, Illinois to Kewanee and became the "Kewanee A's". The team was an affiliate of the Philadelphia Athletics. Playing under manager Joe Glenn, the Moline/Kewanee A's finished with an overall record of 53–74 (36–49 in Kewanee), ending the season sixth place in the 1948 Central Association standings. Moline had been a founding member when the Central Association reformed as a six–team league in 1947, along with the Burlington Indians, Clinton Cubs, Hannibal Pilots, Keokuk Pirates and Rockford Rox.

In their final season, Kewanee captured the 1949 Central Association championship.The 1949 Kewanee A's finished with a regular season record of 68–60, placing third in the Central Association standings, finishing 12.5 games behind the first place Burlington Indians, to qualify for the playoffs. Kewanee had season attendance of 29,482, playing home games at Northeast Park. Kewanee's John Miller led the Central Association with 158 total hits.

In the 1949 playoffs, playing under the manager Harold Hoffman, Kewanee defeated the Keokuk Pirates three games to none to advance. In the Central Association Finals, Kewanee defeated the Cedar Rapids Rockets four games to two and captured the 1949 Central Association Championship. It was the last game played in the league.

The Central Association folded permanently after the 1949 season. Of the six Central Association teams, only Cedar Rapids fielded a team in 1950. Kewanee has not hosted another minor league team.

The ballpark
The 1948 and 1949 Kewanee A's played minor league home games at Northeast Park. The ballpark had a capacity of 2,500 in 1948 and 4,000 in 1949. Today, Northeast Park is still in use as a public park. The location is 1200 North Main Street, Kewanee, Illinois.

Timeline

Year–by–year records

Notable alumni

Art Ditmar (1948)
Joe Glenn (1948, MGR)
Billy Shantz (1948)

See also
Kewanee A's players

References

External links
Kewanee - Baseball Reference
Defunct minor league baseball teams
Defunct baseball teams in Illinois
Professional baseball teams in Illinois
Sports teams in the Quad Cities
Central Association teams
Central Association
Kewanee, Illinois
Baseball teams established in 1948
Baseball teams disestablished in 1949
Philadelphia Athletics minor league affiliates